Wheeler Field was a proposed 5,000-seat baseball park in Virginia Beach, Virginia. It was supposed to host the Virginia Beach Neptunes of the Atlantic League of Professional Baseball, an unspecified team in a summer wooden-bat league, and a junior college team from Tidewater Community College's Virginia Beach campus. Wheeler Capital, a limited liability company that specializes in venture capital financing and small business loans throughout the Mid-Atlantic states, purchased the naming rights for the stadium for an undisclosed amount through 2025.

History
In February 2014, Virginia Beach Professional Baseball received city council approval for a ballpark near the Virginia Beach Sportsplex with completion expected by April 2015. The proposal included a  building designed for Sentara sports medicine, team offices, and 13 recreational athletic fields surrounding Wheeler Field. Subsequent changes deferred three of the fields to a later second phase of the project with the ballpark opening in 2017 and the entire project estimated to cost $37 million.

References

External links
 
 , WAVY TV 10, April 21, 2015

Virginia Beach Neptunes
Unbuilt stadiums in the United States